Terzina may refer to:

 Tercet, three-lined poetic form
 In music, triplet